Rietbron is a town in Sarah Baartman District Municipality in the Eastern Cape province of South Africa.

Village 85 km south-east of Beaufort West and 64 km north-west of Willowmore. The name is Afrikaans and means ‘reed source’, ‘reed fountain’.

References

External links
 

Populated places in the Dr Beyers Naudé Local Municipality